Psychology of Religion and Spirituality is a quarterly peer-reviewed academic journal covering the psychology of religion and spirituality. It was established in 2009 and is published by the American Psychological Association.

Abstracting and indexing
The journal is abstracted and indexed by Scopus, PsycINFO, Arts & Humanities Citation Index, ATLA Religion Database, Current Contents, and the Social Sciences Citation Index. According to the Journal Citation Reports, the journal has a 2020 impact factor of 2.329.

References

External links

Publications established in 2009
Psychology of religion journals
Quarterly journals
American Psychological Association academic journals
English-language journals